Hiroshi Minami may refer to:

 Hiroshi Minami (actor) (1928–1989), Japanese actor
 Hiroshi Minami (politician) (1869–1946), Japanese bureaucrat and politician